Daniel George Pearson (born 26 February 1994) is a Welsh cyclist, who last rode for UCI ProTeam .

Major results

2011
 1st  Road race, National Junior Road Championships
2014
 2nd Coppa della Pace
 8th Overall Giro della Valle d'Aosta
2015
 5th Overall Giro della Valle d'Aosta
 7th Trofeo Alcide Degasperi
2016
 10th Overall Ronde de l'Isard
2018
 6th Overall Tour of Croatia
2019
 4th Overall Tour de la Mirabelle
1st  Mountains classification
1st Stage 2

References

External links

1994 births
Living people
British male cyclists
Welsh male cyclists
Sportspeople from Cardiff